Batong may refer to:
 Batong Line, Beijing Subway, in China
 Batong, Rueso, a sub-District (tambon) in Rueso District (Amphoe) of Thailand
 Kampong Batong, village in Brunei